The Crémieux Decree was a law that granted French citizenship to the majority of the Jewish population in French Algeria (around 35,000), signed by the Government of National Defense on 24 October 1870 during the Franco-Prussian War. It was named after French-Jewish lawyer and Minister of Justice Adolphe Crémieux.

The decree automatically made the native Algerian Jews French citizens, while their Muslim Arabs and Berbers neighbors were excluded and remained under the second-class indigenous status outlined in the Code de l'Indigénat. Muslim Algerians could, on paper, apply individually for French citizenship, but this required that they formally renounce Islam and its laws, and their requests were additionally very seldom accepted. That set the scene for deteriorating relations between the Muslim and Jewish communities, with tensions increased by the colonial administration discrimination between natives and citizens. Seeing one's indigenous brother become a first class citizen while being left as a second class citizen divided locals with animosity.  This eventually proved fateful in the 1954-1962 Algerian War of Independence, after which the vast majority of the Jews of Algeria emigrated to France.

History

Jews first started migrating to Algeria during the Roman period. The Spanish inquisition led to an influx of Jewish migration. In 1865 the Senatus-consulte revised citizenship laws, allowing indigenous Algerian Jews and Muslims to apply for French citizenship. The rationale was assimilation with French culture. Algerian culture prided itself on its customary practices, and as a result application rates were low.  At this point in time, France was focused on assimilating colonized people into French citizens, with the goal of deporting a thriving French colony to French Canada.  Given that European Jews already resided in France, the French held the belief that Algerian Jews were easier to convert to French people due to their having other Sephardic (Portuguese Jews, like Crémieux's mother) and also Ashkenazi brethren in France. Jews had gained recognition in France as a means of control: the French government realized that by enabling Ashkenazi practices, they could appoint chief Rabbis to be installed, with the duty to “inculcate unconditional obedience to the laws, loyalty to France, and the obligation to defend it”. By 1845, they had granted the same system of permission to Algeria in an effort at "civilization", as the local Algerian Jews were viewed as not fully civilized. France had already given the Sephardic Jews of France citizenship in 1790, and almost two years after, in September 1791, to their Ashkenazi co-religionsits who were seen as less French at the time. By granting citizenship to Algerian Jews, the French believed the local Jews would forgo their traditions, and become loyal to France.  The intent was rapid acculturation of Algerian Jews into French Jews.

It was signed as Decree 136 of 1870 by Adolphe Crémieux as Minister of Justice, Léon Gambetta as Minister of the Interior, Alexandre Glais-Bizoin and Martin Fourichon as a naval and colonial minister.  The ministers were members of the military government in Tours, the Gouvernement de la Défense nationale, since France was still at war and the provisional government had its seat in Tours. The Muslim revolt of 1871 created distrust of the indigenous non-Jews, as it established that they would not respect French authority. This amplified French desire to attempt assimilation of Algerian Jews over other indigenous communities, as they felt it would be met with less resistance.

At the same time the naturalization regime in French Algeria was confirmed in Decree 137, determining that Muslims are not French citizens in the French colony of Algeria. The aim was to maintain the status quo, the sovereignty of France over its North African colonies. Five years later, in 1875, this was confirmed in the framework of the Code de l'indigénat.

Decrees 136 and 137 were published in Official Gazette of the City of Tours (Bulletin officielle de la ville de Tours) on 7 November 1870.

From 1940 to 1943, the Crémieux Decree was abolished under the Vichy regime.

After effects of the decree 
Within a generation, most Algerian Jews came to speak French and embrace French culture in its entirety. Conflicts between Sephardic Jewish religious law and the writings of French law disfranchised community members as they attempted to navigate a legal system at odds with their established practise. The French army no longer was in total control of civilian life, as Jews were viewed as equal. Feelings of racial superiority took hold of the French in Algeria, creating a coping mechanism: the French colonists refused to accept Jews as citizens, creating a wave of anti-semitism that increasingly worsened well into the mid-1900s. This led to a divide after the 1882 conquest of M'zab where the French government categorized Southern Algerian Jews and Northern Algerian Jews as distinct entities, recognizing the rights of only the latter, while treating the former as indigenous Algerians.

Vichy France abolished the decree in October 1940, at the same time that it promoted Anti-Jewish laws in metropolitan France. After the Anglo-American landings in Algeria and Morocco in November 1942, Vichyist Admiral Darlan was initially kept in power by the Allies and did not abrogate the laws of Vichy. After Darlan's assassination on December 24, 1942, General Giraud was appointed  French Civil and Military Commander-in-Chief and, on March 14, 1943, he revoked the anti-Semitic laws of Vichy and reinstated the Crémieux decree. It remained in effect until Algeria won its Independence in 1962 and most of the Algerian Jewish population relocated to France.

Text of the decree

References

1870s in Algeria
Jewish French history
French nationality law
Decrees
Jewish emancipation
Jewish Algerian history